Leiomitra is a genus of liverworts in the family Trichocoleaceae.

Species:
 Leiomitra elegans (Lehm.) Hässel de Menéndez
 Leiomitra flaccida Spruce	
 Leiomitra hirticaulis R.M. Schust.	
 Leiomitra julacea Hatcher ex J.J. Engel	
 Leiomitra lanata (Hook.) R.M. Schust.	
 Leiomitra mastigophoroides R.M. Schust.	
 Leiomitra paraphyllina Spruce	
 Leiomitra smaragdina Hässel de Menéndez
 Leiomitra sphagnoides Spruce	
 Leiomitra tomentosa (Sw.) Lindb.

Jungermanniales
Jungermanniales genera